Grindle is a surname. Notable people with the name include:

Surname:
 Alfred Grindle, English born architect
 Henry Dyer Grindle, American physician
 Lucretia Grindle, American author
 Nicole Paradis Grindle, American film producer
 Teal Grindle, British artistic gymnast

See also
 Grindle Rock, rock near the South Sandwich Islands